Hahm Eun-Jung (known professionally as Eun-Jung) is a South Korean singer and actress. Eunjung began her singing career with the 2008 Single "Blue Moon" (Featuring Davichi & Seeya). During her pre-debut, she released multiple singles and collaborations until she officially debuted as a member of girl group T-ara in 2009.

Eunjung officially debuted as a solo artist in 2015 with her first mini-album I'm Good.

Concert tours

Desire Mini-Live Tour

One-off concerts

Fan meetings

Festivals

Joint Concerts & Tours

TV shows and specials

References 

Eun-Jung